The women's 800 metres at the 2012 European Athletics Championships was held at the Helsinki Olympic Stadium on 28 and 29 June.

On 30 April 2013, it was announced that the original winner of the gold medal, Elena Arzhakova had been suspended for two years from January 2013 for a doping violation, and was to be stripped of all results gained since July 11, 2011. When ratified, this would mean Arzhakova being stripped of her gold medal, which would then be awarded to Lynsey Sharp. Irina Maracheva and Maryna Arzamasava would also each be awarded an upgraded medal.

On 4 June 2013, this reallocation of medals was confirmed, and Lynsey Sharp declared European champion.

On 25 January 2016, it was announced that the new silver medalist, Irina Maracheva had also been found guilty of doping changes as a result of her blood passport. As a result, in due course Maracheva will be stripped of her result, Arzamasava promoted again, this time into silver and Lilyia Lobanova, original placed fifth, will be awarded the bronze medal.

Medalists

These are the revised medal standings following the adverse drugs finding against original winner Elena Arzhakova.

Records

Schedule

Results

Round 1
First 2 in each heat (Q) and 2 best performers (q) advance to the Final.

 Elena Arzhakova originally ranked second, prior to disqualification. Irina Maracheva originally ranked ninth, prior to disqualification

Final

References

 Round 1 Results
 Final Results
Full results

800 W
800 metres at the European Athletics Championships
2012 in women's athletics